Friesen is a surname. Notable people with the surname include:

Albert D. Friesen (born 1947), Canadian biotechnologist
Alex Friesen (born 1991), Canadian professional ice hockey player
Benno Friesen (born 1929), Canadian administrator, professor and politician
Brandon Friesen, American music producer, audio engineer, mixer and television producer
Cameron Friesen, Canadian politician
Curt Friesen (born 1955), American politician
Curwin Friesen, Canadian businessman
David Friesen (born 1942), American jazz bassist
Dawna Friesen (born 1964), Canadian television journalist
Don Friesen, American stand-up comedian
Dustin Friesen (born 1983), Canadian-German professional ice hockey player
Eira Friesen (1917–2008), Welsh-born Canadian community activist
Eugene Friesen (born 1952), American cellist and composer
Gayle Friesen (born 1960), Canadian author
Gil Friesen (1937–2012), American music and film executive
Gordon Friesen (1909-1996), American folk musician
Henry Friesen (born 1934), Canadian endocrinologist
Jackie Friesen (born 1983), American ice hockey player
Jean Friesen (born 1943), Canadian politician
Jeff Friesen (born 1976), Canadian ice hockey player
Jerry Friesen (born 1955), Canadian football linebacker
Karl Friesen (born 1958), Canadian ice hockey player
Marine Friesen (born 1988), Brazilian Christian singer and songwriter
Norm Friesen (born 1966), Canadian professor
Patrick Friesen (born 1946), Canadian author
Pete Friesen (born 1965), Canadian guitarist
Rob Friesen (born 1968), Canadian ice hockey player
Sten von Friesen (1907-1996), Swedish physicist
Steve Friesen (born 1977), American golfer
Stewart Friesen (born 1983), Canadian stock car racing driver

References 

Surnames of French origin
Surnames of German origin
Surnames of Swiss origin
French-language surnames
German-language surnames
Russian Mennonite surnames